The castle of Alcañices is a castle located in Alcañices, Zamora, one of the four fortress located in the north of the Duero.

In 1210 it belonged to the Templar Order until its dissolution. The king Alfonso IX of León gave the castle to the templars in 1211, where there was celebrated the great victories of the order. Nowadays only ruins are preserved.

References

External links 

Castles in Castile and León
Castles and fortifications of the Knights Templar
Former castles in Spain
Ruined castles in Spain